Stadio Pietro Fortunati is a football stadium in Pavia, Italy.  It is the home ground of A.C. Pavia.  The stadium holds 4,999.

Pietro Fotunati
Buildings and structures in Pavia
F.C. Pavia
Sports venues in Lombardy